Wind Gate, also known as Wind Passage and Windgate, is an outdoor bronze sculpture by American artist Hilda Grossman Morris, located in front of Eliot Hall on the Reed College campus in Portland, Oregon, United States. It was created during 1967–1968  and permanently installed on the campus in 1980.

Description
The cast and welded bronze sculpture measures approximately  x  x , marking Morris' largest sculpture up to the time it was completed. The Smithsonian Institution categorizes the work as abstract, allegorical (wind) and architectural (gate). It has been described as "three knife-sail forms that slash through space, radiating out from a central void at roughly equal distances from each other."

History

Wind Gate took two years to create (1967–1968) and was largely completed in Morris' studio in the Mariana foundry in Pietrasanta, Italy. The piece was installed permanently in 1980 and dedicated at the October exhibition of the Reed Art Associates, called "Hilda Morris: Wind Gate". On October 11, a ceremony was held on the front lawn of Eliot Hall after a reception in the faculty office building gallery. A "process exhibition" showcasing how Morris created Wind Gate was displayed from October 9 to November 11. It featured studies in the form of a bronze maquette and a midstage bronze, original plaster sections, drawings, and pictures of the casting and installation processes.

Financial contributors included Morris, the J.M. Kaplan Fund, Mr. and Mrs. Julian Cheatham, Mr. and Mrs. Alfred Corbett, Mr. and Mrs. C. Girard Davidson, Mrs. Joan Kaplain Davidson, Mr. and Mrs. Paul Feldenheimer, Mrs. and Mrs. Carl Halvorson, Mr. and Mrs. Harold Hirsch, Mr. and Mrs. John Platt, Mr. and Mrs. David Pugh, Mr. and Mrs. Howard Vollum, Mrs. Simeon Reed Winch, the H.A. Andersen Company, Northwest Stone, Skidmore, Owings & Merrill, and the Wilhelm Trucking Company.

According to Scott Sonniksen, then Reed gallery director and associate professor of art, Morris' exhibition marked the last in the faculty office building gallery. He said, "It is quite fitting that she bring to a close the long tradition of fine art exhibitions in the old gallery, because of her long association with the College." The exhibition program was then moved to the college center. The gallery series, of which Morris' exhibition was a part, was supported by the Reed Art Associates, Metropolitan Arts Commission, Oregon Arts Commission and the National Endowment for the Arts. 

The sculpture's condition was deemed "treatment needed" by Smithsonian's "Save Outdoor Sculpture!" program in 1994. It is administered by Reed College.

See also

 1980 in art
 Architectural sculpture in the United States

References

1980 establishments in Oregon
1980 sculptures
Abstract sculptures in Oregon
Allegorical sculptures in Oregon
Bronze sculptures in Oregon
Outdoor sculptures in Portland, Oregon
Reed College campus